Lombard–South is a subway station on SEPTA's Broad Street Line, located at 500 South Broad Street, at the intersection of Broad Street and Lombard Street in the Washington Square West area of Philadelphia, Pennsylvania .  It serves only Broad Street Line local service trains and consists of one platform.

Lombard–South station is located within short walking distance of the South Street Headhouse District (approximately 4-5 blocks east).  Other area sights include the University of the Arts, Peirce College, and, approximately four blocks west, the Graduate Hospital campus and neighborhood.

Station layout
There are four street entrances to the station, two at Broad and South streets, as well as two at Broad and Lombard streets.

Gallery

References

External links

 Lombard Street entrance from Google Maps Street View
 South Street entrance from Google Maps Street View

SEPTA Broad Street Line stations
Railway stations in the United States opened in 1930
Railway stations in Philadelphia
Railway stations located underground in Pennsylvania
1930 establishments in Pennsylvania